Harrow Weald is a suburban district in Greater London, England. It forms part of the London Borough of Harrow.

Harrow Weald is near Bushey Heath, Stanmore, Wealdstone, Headstone and Hatch End. It is in the HA postcode area.

Etmyology
The word Weald is Old English in origin, meaning woodland. It was recorded as waldis in 1303 and welde in 1382, but the name Harrow Weald is not recorded until 1553. It was then part of the great Forest of Middlesex.

Geography and locale

Ancient woodland on high ground fills most of the northern part of Harrow Weald on the border of Greater London (and the traditional county of Middlesex) with Hertfordshire. The eastern part of the woods merges into those of Stanmore and encompasses Bentley Priory. The priory's grounds are now Bentley Priory Nature Reserve, a biological Site of Special Scientific Interest. Along the southern edge of the high ground runs the road Old Redding and a car park here gives views over parts of London. The western part of the woodland forms Harrow Weald Common, which adjoins Harrow Weald SSSI, a geological Site of Special Scientific Interest. Other smaller woods surround the Grim's Dyke Hotel, the former country house of W. S. Gilbert. Gilbert and Sullivan's comic operas are frequently performed here. The monument remains largely mysterious but is known to have been named in the Saxon era. The ditch hints at a long history of habitation in the area and many artefacts have been found on the common to support this.

The Friends Of Harrow Weald is based at Harrow Weald Recreation Ground.

The south of the area is a suburban development with houses, schools, small shops, supermarkets and pubs (notably Bombay Central, formerly the Weald Stone Inn, and before that the Red Lion). The area expanded around the First World War and continued to grow quickly: the population grew from 1,517 in 1901 to 10,923 in 1931.

The Harrow Weald campus of Harrow College (previously a grammar school, then a 16+ college) and Harrow Weald Cemetery are at the northern edge of the built up area. All Saints churchyard and its extension adjoin this cemetery and their most famous interment is of Leefe Robinson, a pilot who was awarded the Victoria Cross. Also buried at All Saints is the English-born Hollywood actor George Arliss (1868-1946), who won the Academy Award for Best Actor in 1930.

Demography
The 2011 census showed that in the Harrow Weald ward, 53% of the population was white (41% British, 6% Other, 5% Irish). The largest non-white group was Indian at 19%. Of the 4,160 household tenures, 68.4% of them are owned, 15.9% are socially rented and 13.7% are privately rented. The unemployment rate of economically active people was 4.9%. The median age of the population is 39.

Transport
There are no train stations in the centre of Harrow Weald, but Headstone Lane railway station is to the west, whereas Harrow & Wealdstone station is to the south.

Buses
London Bus routes 140, 182, 186, 258, 340, 640, H12, H18, H19 and N18 operate through the area. The N140 bus also goes through Harrow Weald, it was introduced on 17 June 1972.

Governance
Harrow Weald ward is in the Harrow East constituency, represented by Conservative MP Bob Blackman.

References

Areas of London
Districts of the London Borough of Harrow
Places formerly in Middlesex